Jean René Constant Quoy (10 November 1790 in Maillé – 4 July 1869 in Rochefort) was a French naval surgeon, zoologist and anatomist.

In 1806, he began his medical studies at the school of naval medicine at Rochefort, afterwards serving as an auxiliary-surgeon on a trip to the Antilles (1808–1809). After earning his medical doctorate in 1814 at Montpellier, he was surgeon-major on a journey to Réunion (1814–1815).

Along with Joseph Paul Gaimard, he served as naturalist and surgeon aboard the Uranie under Louis de Freycinet from 1817 to 1820, and on the Astrolabe (1826–1829) under the command of Jules Dumont d'Urville. In July 1823 he and Gaimard presented a paper to the Académie royale des Sciences on the origin of coral reefs, taking issue with the then widespread belief that these were constructed by coral polyps from bases in very deep water and arguing instead that the original bases must have been in shallow water because reef-building polyps were confined to water depths of just a few tens of metres. Their work was quoted by Charles Darwin in his seminal monograph on the origin on reefs and atolls. While on the Astrolabe expedition Quoy and Gaimard collected and described Tachygia microlepis, the now extinct giant skink of Tonga.

Along with his skills as a naturalist, Quoy was acclaimed for his work as an artist.

In 1824, he was appointed professor of anatomy at the Rochefort Naval School, where from 1832 to 1835, he was a professor of medicine. He then continued his career at naval hospitals in Toulon (1835–1837) and in Brest (1838–1848), afterwards being chosen inspector general of the Naval Bureau of Medicine and Surgery (serving from 1848 to 1858).

Taxonomy
The following genera or species were named in his honor:
Cracticus quoyi  – the black butcherbird
Quoya  – a genus of sea slugs
Quoyia  – a genus of extinct marine gastropods
Terebra quoygaimardi  – a species of sea snail
Pilumnus quoyi  – a species of crab
Ischnochiton quoyanus  – a species of chiton
Eulamprus quoyii  – a species of skink
Quoya  – a genus of Australian plants

Writings
Voyage autour du monde … pendant les années 1817, 1818, 1819 et 1820. (with Louis Claude Desaulses de Freycinet,  Joseph Paul Gaimard, Charles Gaudichaud-Beaupré, et al.).
Voyage de la corvette l'Astrolabe exécuté par ordre du Roi, pendant les années 1826-1827-1828-1829 sous le commandement de M. J. Dumont d'Urville. (with Jules-Sébastien-César Dumont d'Urville, J Tastu and Joseph Paul Gaimard).

Sources
Mearns, Barbara; Mearns, Richard (1998). The Bird Collectors. Cambridge, Massachusetts: Academic Press. 472 pp. .

See also
:Category:Taxa named by Jean René Constant Quoy

References

French ornithologists
French zoologists
People from Vendée
French military doctors
Members of the French Academy of Sciences
Teuthologists
1790 births
1869 deaths
Commandeurs of the Légion d'honneur
Conchologists
Naval surgeons